Jimmy Wélépane (born 5 January 1999) is a New Caledonian international footballer who plays as a defender for New Caledonia Super Ligue side AS Lössi.

Career statistics

International

References

1999 births
Living people
New Caledonian footballers
New Caledonia international footballers
Association football defenders
AS Lössi players